Carnot-Moon is a census-designated place (CDP) in central Moon Township, Allegheny County, Pennsylvania, United States. The population was 13,151 at the 2020 census.

Geography
Carnot-Moon is at  (40.517800, -80.211649).

It lies entirely within Moon Township.

Demographics

At the 2000 census there were 10,637 people, 4,327 households, and 2,544 families living in the CDP. The population density was 1,781.9 people per square mile (687.9/km). There were 4,943 housing units at an average density of 828.0/sq mi (319.7/km).  The racial makeup of the CDP was 90.32% White, 5.31% African American, 0.11% Native American, 2.69% Asian, 0.05% Pacific Islander, 0.32% from other races, and 1.20% from two or more races. Hispanic or Latino of any race were 1.05%.

There were 4,327 households, 24.0% had children under the age of 18 living with them, 48.2% were married couples living together, 7.7% had a female householder with no husband present, and 41.2% were non-families. 34.6% of households were made up of individuals, and 7.6% were one person aged 65 or older. The average household size was 2.19 and the average family size was 2.85.

The age distribution was 18.1% under the age of 18, 16.8% from 18 to 24, 29.8% from 25 to 44, 23.2% from 45 to 64, and 12.1% 65 or older. The median age was 35 years. For every 100 females, there were 101.3 males. For every 100 females age 18 and over, there were 100.8 males.

The median household income was $49,436 and the median family income  was $62,045. Males had a median income of $43,855 versus $30,130 for females. The per capita income for the CDP was $23,960. About 2.7% of families and 5.0% of the population were below the poverty line, including 4.9% of those under age 18 and 1.3% of those age 65 or over.

References

Census-designated places in Allegheny County, Pennsylvania
Pittsburgh metropolitan area
Census-designated places in Pennsylvania